The 1993–94 Women's National League Cup was a football competition in England organised by  the Women's Football Alliance and the Football Association Committee for Women’s Football. It was the third edition of the Women's National League Cup, and included teams from the 1993–94 WFA National League Premier Division and level 2 divisions.

The Cup was established in 1991–92, along with the National League, by the Women's Football Association. The National League competitions were renamed the following season as the FA Women's Premier League, from 1994–95 until 2018.

The 1993–94 trophy was won for the third consecutive time by Arsenal. In the 1994 final, they won 4–0 against Doncaster Belles. Doncaster were the 1993–94 season's Premier Division champions and had won the 1994 FA Women's Cup Final.

References

External links
 League Cup 1994, The Owl Football Historian

1993–94 in English women's football
FA Women's National League Cup
1993–94 domestic association football cups
Doncaster Rovers Belles L.F.C. matches